Richard A. Murphy (May 20, 1944 – March 24, 2022) was an American neuroscientist.

Biography
Murphy was the chair of the Department of Anatomy and Cell Biology at the University of Alberta from 1986 to 1992. He then ran the Montreal Neurological Institute and Hospital at McGill University from 1992 to 2000, the Salk Institute from 2000 to 2007, and was the interim president of the California Institute for Regenerative Medicine from 2007 to 2008.

He died on March 24, 2022, at age 77.

References

1944 births
2022 deaths
American neuroscientists
College of the Holy Cross alumni
Rutgers University alumni
Harvard University faculty
Academic staff of McGill University
Academic staff of the University of Alberta